The history of Louisville, Kentucky, United States, as a city is considered to have started on February 13, 1828, the date of the first city charter. From the time of its first organization as a village, on February 7, 1781, until its incorporation as a city, it was governed by a board of trustees. At the time when its growth and commercial importance demanded the change of its government, it was chartered by the state legislature into a city of five wards and placed under the government of a mayor and city council, the latter being composed of ten members, two from each ward.

History of the office 
The first election under the Act of Incorporation took place in March 1828. All free white males who had lived in the city for at least six months prior to the election could vote, although mayors were not elected directly initially. The two top vote-getters were referred to the Governor, who selected the mayor from the two, with senate approval. The early mayor was relatively weak, acting mostly as a Justice of the Peace, serving a one-year term, and lacking a vote on the City Council except to break ties.

A change to the charter in 1838 allowed for direct election of a mayor, extended the term to three years, and prevented incumbents from running for re-election. The term was reduced to two years from 1851 to 1870, then returned to three, and was finally set at four years by the Kentucky Legislature in 1894. In the early 20th century, corruption and political machines were rampant, causing mayors of both parties to be removed from office by courts. All legislative power was given to the Board of Aldermen in 1929. Mayoral term limits were set at three in 1986.

On January 6, 2003, the city of Louisville and Jefferson County governments merged to form the government of Louisville Metro, and the office of Mayor of Louisville Metro was created.

Incorporated city

Louisville Metro

See also 
 Louisville Metro Council
 Government of Louisville, Kentucky
 History of Louisville, Kentucky
 Timeline of Louisville, Kentucky
 Louisville mayoral election, 2014

Notes

References 
 Memorial History of Louisville, 1896, Volume 1, page 77 by J. Stoddard Johnson.
 

Louisville

Mayors